Irving Reiner (February 8, 1924 in Brooklyn, New York – October 28, 1986 in Urbana, Illinois) was a mathematician at the University of Illinois who worked on representation theory. He solved the problem of finding which abelian groups have a finite number of indecomposable modules. His book with Charles W. Curtis, was for many years the standard text on representation theory.

Life 
Reiner obtained his Ph.D. from Cornell University in 1947; his dissertation, A generalization of Meyer's theorem, was written under the supervision of Burton Wadsworth Jones. He met another one of Jones' students, Irma Moses, leading to their marriage in August 1948 and two children, Peter Reiner and David Reiner.

Reiner met Hua Luogeng while at the Institute for Advanced Study and subsequently collaborated on three joint papers:

 On the generators of the symplectic modular group (1949);
 Automorphisms of the unimodular group (1951);
 Automorphisms of the projective unimodular group (1952)

They remained friends as they attended the University of Illinois, before Hua returned to his native China and Reiner remained in Illinois.

Bibliography

References

External links

Irving Reiner memorial award.

20th-century American mathematicians
University of Illinois Urbana-Champaign faculty
People from Brooklyn
1924 births
1986 deaths
Mathematicians from New York (state)
Cornell University alumni